Paanch Qaidi is a 1981 Indian Hindi-language action film directed by Shibu Mitra. and produced by Vikas-Veena Sharma. This film was released under Manish Films.

Plot 
Police DySP Bijay takes five deadly convicts into his personal responsibility from the prison, knowing that they are all dangerous and have a criminal past. Bijay and those outlaws settle in a village which is already terrorised by another group of dacoits. Bijay now wants to stop them with the help of his five prisoners.

Cast 

 Girish Karnad as DSP Vijay
Zarina Wahab as Shanti , Wife of DSP Vijay
 Vijayendra Ghatge as Anand Raj, Prisoner
 Mahendra Sandhu
 Amjad Khan as Raja ,Prisoner
 Raza Murad as Balwant Singh, Prisoner
Dev Kumar as Sher Singh, Prisoner
 Shakti Kapoor
 Sarika as Roopa
 Ranjeet as Dacait Mangal Singh
 Helen as Dancer
Surendra Pal as Police Inspector Surendra Pal Singh
 Viju Khote
 Sulochana Latkar

Soundtrack

References 

1981 films
Indian action films
1980s Hindi-language films
Films scored by Bappi Lahiri
Films directed by Shibu Mitra
1981 action films